Indy Week, formerly known as the Independent Weekly and originally the North Carolina Independent, is a tabloid-format alternative weekly newspaper published in Durham, North Carolina, United States, and distributed throughout the Research Triangle area (Raleigh, Durham, Chapel Hill, and Cary) and counties (Wake County, Durham County, Orange County, and Chatham County). Its first issue was published in April 1983.

Indy Week is a member of the Association of Alternative Newsmedia  and has a progressive, liberal political perspective. The Columbia Journalism Review has cited the newspaper for its "spine of steel." The print edition is published on Wednesdays.

History
The paper was founded in 1983 by Steve Schewel and was originally published as the North Carolina Independent and was bi-weekly.  Its publisher was Carolina Independent Publications, Inc.  It was renamed the Independent effective March 1985. In April 1988 the Independent published endorsements of state political candidates for the upcoming Democratic Party's primary election. The paper admonished its readers not to vote for state senator Harold Hardison and in response a member of Hardison's campaign organization collected approximately 7,000 copies of the paper from newsstands in downtown Raleigh and dumped them in the trash. The Independent identified the person responsible and reported the story in its next edition. The story was reported by media across North Carolina, raising the newspaper's public profile. In 1989, publication was changed to weekly, and the name altered to the Independent Weekly.

In September 2002, Carolina Independent Publications acquired the area's other major weekly, the Spectator, from Creative Loafing Inc. Founded in 1978 by Godfrey Cheshire and others in Raleigh,  the Spectator had been owned by Creative Loafing since 1997 and was well known for its coverage of the arts; the name lived on as the name of the Independent's calendar of events.

In 2010, the Independent presented the inaugural Hopscotch Music Festival in downtown Raleigh. The three-day annual event happens in September and features local, national and international bands.

On September 27, 2012, the Independent Weekly was purchased by ZM INDY, Inc., whose owners, Mark Zusman and Richard Meeker, also own Willamette Week. The name of the newspaper and website was changed to Indy Week.

On June 11, 2020, Jeffrey Billman was fired from his position as Editor.  The stated reason was that he had failed to follow up on a sexual misconduct tip regarding a local restaurant that had been brought to his attention in May 2019. Possibly prompting the dismissal, the edit and design staff released a letter stating their unwillingness to work for Billman going forward.
Jane Porter started as Editor-in-Chief in January 2021.

Awards 
The paper's reporters have won several major awards, including the George Polk Award, the Investigative Reporters and Editors Award (finalist), the Green Eyeshade Award for the South's best journalism (second place, 2004, 2005 & 2019), the Baltimore Suns H.L. Mencken Writing Award, and the Casey Medal for Meritorious Journalism.

See also
 The Santa Fe Reporter, also published by Richard Meeker and Mark Zusman
Willamette Week (Willamette, OR), also published by Meeker & Zusman.

References

Works cited

External links

Alternative weekly newspapers published in the United States
Mass media in Durham, North Carolina
Weekly newspapers published in North Carolina
Independent newspapers published in the United States
Publications established in 1983
1983 establishments in North Carolina